This is an overview of the fossil flora and fauna of the Maastrichtian-Danian Hell Creek Formation.

Invertebrates 
Insects like Diptera, Zygopteran, and possibly hemiphlebiid damselflies have been unearthed in Hell Creek in amber. Fossils found in the Hell Creek Formation and the Fort Union Formation of these insects went extinct during the K-T Event.

Amphibians

Fish

Bony fish

Cartilaginous fish

Dinosaurs 

A paleo-population study is one of the most difficult of analyses to conduct in field paleontology. Here is the most recent estimate of the proportions of the eight most common dinosaurian families in the Hell Creek Formation, based on detailed field studies by White, Fastovsky and Sheehan (1998). 

 Ceratopsidae 61%
 Hadrosauridae 23%
 Ornithomimidae 5%
 Tyrannosauridae 4%
 Hypsilophodontidae 3%
 Dromaeosauridae 2%
 Pachycephalosauridae 1%
 Troodontidae 1% (represented only by teeth)

Outcrops sampled by the Hell Creek Project were divided into three sections: lower, middle and upper slices. The top and bottom sections were the focus of the PLoS One report, and within each portion many remains of Triceratops, Edmontosaurus, and Tyrannosaurus were found. Triceratops was the most common in each section, but, surprisingly, Tyrannosaurus was just as common, if not slightly more common, than the hadrosaur Edmontosaurus. In the upper Hell Creek section, for example, the census included twenty two Triceratops, five Tyrannosaurus, and five Edmontosaurus.

The dinosaurs Thescelosaurus, Ornithomimus, Pachycephalosaurus and Ankylosaurus were also included in the breakdown, but were relatively rare. Other dinosaurs, such as Sphaerotholus, Denversaurus, Torosaurus, Struthiomimus, Acheroraptor, Dakotaraptor, Pectinodon, Richardoestesia, Paronychodon, Anzu, Leptorhynchos and Troodon (more likely Pectinodon), were reported as being rare and are not included in the breakdown.

The dinosaur collections made over the past decade during the Hell Creek Project yielded new information from an improved genus-level collecting schema and robust data set that revealed relative dinosaur abundances that were unexpected, and ontogenetic age classes previously considered rare. We recognize a much higher percentage of Tyrannosaurus than previous surveys. Tyrannosaurus equals Edmontosaurus in U3 and in L3 comprises a greater percentage of the large dinosaur fauna as the second-most abundant taxon after Triceratops, followed by Edmontosaurus. This is surprisingly consistent in (1) the two major lag deposits (MOR loc. HC-530 and HC-312) in the Apex sandstone and Jen-rex sand where individual bones were counted and (2) in two thirds of the formation reflected in L3 and U3 records of dinosaur skeletons only.

Triceratops is by far the most common dinosaur at 40% (n = 72), Tyrannosaurus is second at 24% (n = 44), Edmontosaurus is third at 20% (n = 36), followed by Thescelosaurus at 8% (n = 15), Ornithomimus at 5% (n = 9), and Pachycephalosaurus and Ankylosaurus both at 1% (n = 2) are relatively rare.

Fossil footprints of dinosaurs from the Hell Creek Formation are very rare. As of 2017, there is only one find of a possible Tyrannosaurus rex footprint, dating from 2007 and described a year later. A trackway made by mid-sized theropod, possibly a small tyrannosaurid individual, was discovered in South Dakota in 1997, and in 2014 these footprints were named Wakinyantanka styxi.

Ornithischians

Ankylosaurs 
Indeterminate nodosaur remains have been unearthed in the Hell Creek Formation and other nearby areas.

Pachycephalosaurs 
An undescribed and unnamed pachycephalosaur is present in North Dakota. Pachycephalosaur remains have been unearthed in Montana as in the case of the now invalid genus Stenotholus kohleri, which is now a junior synonym of Pachycephalosaurus.

Ceratopsians 
Indeterminate ceratopsid teeth and some identifiable bones from Triceratops can be extremely common. 8.31% of all vertebrate remains from the Hell Creek Formation are unassigned ceratopsids. In 2012, a new unidentified species of chasmosaur ceratopsian with noticeable differences from Triceratops was unearthed in South Dakota by a fossil hunter named John Carter.

Ornithopods and relatives 
Indeterminate hadrosaurid remains are very common in the Hell Creek Formation.

Theropods 
Theropod tracks have been found in South Dakota. A trackway from South Dakota, named Wakinyantanka, was made by a mid-sized theropod with three slender toes, possibly a small tyrannosaurid. A second footprint that may have been made by a specimen of Tyrannosaurus was first reported in 2007 by British paleontologist Phil Manning, from the Hell Creek Formation of Montana. Whether or not the track was made by Tyrannosaurus is unclear, though Tyrannosaurus is the only large theropod known to have existed in the Hell Creek Formation, though in past albertosaurine remains have described here but its most likely that they are the remains of Tyrannosaurus rex. Theropod remains are very common in Hell Creek, some of which belong to indeterminate species on maniraptorans.

Alvarezsaurs

Tyrannosaurids

Ornithomimosaurs 
Ornithomimid remains are not uncommon in the Hell Creek Formation. Fifteen specimens from the Hell Creek Formation are undetermined ornithomimids

Oviraptorosaurs 
Oviraptorosaur fossils have been found at the Hell Creek Formation for many years, most notably from isolated elements until the discovery of Anzu. In the past, oviraptorosaur fossils found were thought to have belonged to Caenagnathus, Chirostenotes, and Elmisaurus. In 2016, an undescribed large-bodied caenagnathid was unearthed in Montana.

Eumaniraptorans 
Historically, numerous teeth have been attributed to various dromaeosaurid and troodontid taxa with known body fossils from only older formations, including Saurornithoides, Zapsalis, Dromaeosaurus, Saurornitholestes, and Troodon. However, in a 2013 study, Evans et al. concluded that there is little evidence for more than a single dromaeosaurid taxon, Acheroraptor, in the Hell Creek-Lance assemblages, which would render these taxa invalid for this formation. This was disproved in a 2015 study, DePalma et al., when they described the new genus Dakotaraptor, a large species of dromaeosaur. Fossilized teeth of various troodontids and coelurosaurs are common throughout the Hell Creek Formation; the best known examples include Paronychodon, Pectinodon and Richardoestesia, respectively. Teeth belonging to possible intermediate species of Dromaeosaurus and Saurornitholestes have been unearthed at the Hell Creek Formation and the nearby Lance Formation.

Pterosaurs 
Indeterminate azhdarchid remains, most likely belong to Quetzalcoatlus or an unidentified genus, have been found in Hell Creek as well as the Javelina Formation and the Ojo Alamo Formation. Indeterminate pteranodontid remains have also been found here as well.

Crocodylomorphs

Plesiosaurs 
Indeterminate plesiosaur remains have been found in Hell Creek.

Turtles

Squamata 

Choristoderans

Mammals

Multituberculates

Metatherians

Eutherians

Flora 

 
The Hell Creek Formation was a low floodplain at the time before the sea retreated, and in the wet ground of the dense woodland, laurels, sycamores, beech, magnolias, and palm trees grew. Ferns and moss grew in the forest understory. Plant fossils from the upper early Paleocene of the Hell Creek Formation include the ferns Botrychium, Woodwardia, Osmunda, Onoclea and Azolla; conifers Metasequoia, Glyptostrobus and cupressaceous conifers; the monocot Limnobiophyllum (a relative of duckweeds); and the dicots Cercidiphyllum and Platanus. There are numerous types of leaves, seeds, flowers and other structures from Angiosperms, or flowering plants. The Hell Creek Formation of this layer contains 300 tablets or more of plants. Angiosperms are by far the most diverse and dominant flora of the entire population, about 90 percent. However, the evergreens included conifers, ginkgo, bald cypress, and cycads. Flowering plants included a variety of trees that no longer exist. Today Hell Creek's flora is hardwood forest mixed with deciduous and evergreen forest and apparently similar to then, but with a closer look, the current plant community is distinct. In sharp contrast to Montana today, the presence of palm trees meant the climate was warmer then.

Dr. Kirk Johnson claims that there are no grasses, oaks, maples, or willows in the Hell Creek Formation. Ferns are uncommon in the majority of the formation, however there is a great increase in the abundance of fossil fern spores in the two centimeters of rock that directly overlies the impact fallout layer (the famous K-T boundary layer). This increase in fern spore abundance is commonly referred to as "the fern spike" (meaning that if the abundance of spores as a function of stratigraphic position were plotted out, the graph would show a spike just above the impact fallout layer). Johnson also found that the majority of the angiosperm genera in the Hell Creek Formation are now extinct. He also believes that, very roughly, 80% of the terrestrial plant taxa died out in what is now Montana and the Dakotas at the K/T boundary.

Many of the modern plant affinities in the Hell Creek Formation (e.g., those with the prefix "aff." or with quotes around the genus name) may not in reality belong to these genera; instead they could be entirely different plants that resemble modern genera. Therefore, there is some question regarding whether the modern Populus or Juglans, as two examples, actually lived in the late Cretaceous.

Compared to the rich Hell Creek Formation fossil plant localities of the Dakotas, relatively few plant specimens have been collected from Montana. A few taxa were collected at Brownie Butte Montana by Shoemaker, but most plants were collected from North Dakota (Slope County) and from South Dakota. "TYPE" after the binomial means that it is represented by a type specimen found in the Yale-Peabody Museum collections. "YPM" is the prefix for the Yale-Peabody Museum specimen number.

Overview (from Johnson, 1997):
190 plant morphotypes, including:
1 bryophyte (mosses and liverworts)
6 "pteridophytes" (A paraphyletic group: modern examples are horsetails, club mosses and ferns.)
9 conifers
2 ginkgo (uncommon)
172 angiosperms (90% of all specimens collected, as well as 90% of all taxa found)

Plants of the Hell Creek Formation
 various ferns and cycads.
 Equisetum (Equisetaceae)

Gymnosperms

Platyspiroxylon (Cupressaceae)
Podocarpoxylon (Podocarpaceae)
Elatocladus (Taxodiaceae)
Sequoiaxylon (Taxodiaceae)
Taxodioxylon (Taxodiaceae)
Araucaria (Araucariaceae)
Cheirolepidiaceae

Ginkgos
Baiera
Ginkgo adiantoides

Angiosperms

 Artocarpus (Moraceae)
 Barberry family (Berberidaceae)
 Cercidiphyllum (Cercidiphyllaceae)
 Dombeyopsis (Sterculiaceae)
 Laurel family (Lauraceae)
 Magnolia (Magnoliaceae)
 Palms (Arecaceae)
 Platanus, sycamore or plane tree (Platanaceae)

See also 
 List of fossil sites (with link directory)
 Lists of dinosaur-bearing stratigraphic units
 Paleobiota of the Morrison Formation
 Lance fauna
 Cretaceous-Paleogene formations
 Tremp Formation, Spain
 Tremp Formation, Spain
 Lefipán Formation, Argentina
 Lopez de Bertodano Formation, Antarctica

References

Bibliography 
General
  
 
 

Geology

     
    
   
 
 

Paleontology

External links 
 Cretaceous Hell Creek Faunal Facies provides a faunal list
 Phillip Bigelow, "Hell Creek life: Fossil Flora & Fauna, a Paleoecosystem"
 Paleobiology Database: MPM locality 3850 (Hell Creek Formation): Maastrichtian, Montana

Maastrichtian life
Cretaceous–Paleogene boundary
Danian life
Natural history of Montana
Natural history of North Dakota
Natural history of South Dakota
Natural history of Wyoming
Paleontology in the United States
National Natural Landmarks in Montana
.
 
.
Hell Creek Paleobiota
Cretaceous fossil record
Hell Creek Formation
Hell Creek Formation